Abdurrahman Dereli (born 15 February 1981) is a Turkish professional footballer. He last played as a right back for Balıkesirspor in the Süper Lig.

References

Balıkesirspor'da 2 ayrılık, fanatik.com.tr, 2 January 2016

External links
 
 
 

1981 births
Living people
Sportspeople from Trabzon
Turkish footballers
Turkey youth international footballers
Süper Lig players
Akçaabat Sebatspor footballers
MKE Ankaragücü footballers
Sivasspor footballers
Orduspor footballers
Kasımpaşa S.K. footballers
Balıkesirspor footballers
TFF First League players
Association football defenders